Melissa Hutchison is an American voice actress, who is well known for her voice role as Clementine in The Walking Dead and its sequels, for which she won Best Performance by a Female at the 2013 Spike Video Game Awards and was nominated for the 2014 NAVGTR Award Performance in a Drama, Lead respectively. She has also been nominated twice for a BAFTA Award for Best Performer.

Filmography

Video games

Television

Film

References

External links
 
 
 
 Melissa Hutchison convention appearances on FanCons.com
 

21st-century American actresses
Actresses from Missouri
American video game actresses
People from Springfield, Missouri
American voice actresses
Living people
Year of birth missing (living people)